"Whiskey Tango Foxtrot" is the first episode of the eleventh season of the American police procedural drama NCIS, and the 235th episode overall. It originally aired on CBS in the United States on September 24, 2013. The episode is written by Gary Glasberg and directed by Tony Wharmby, and was seen by 20.02 million viewers.

Plot 
In the aftermath of the Season 10 finale, Gibbs' team has been left divided as Tony and McGee attempt to adjust to life as civilians while Ziva has returned home to Israel. Parsons' investigation into Gibbs' team continues but things take an intense turn when a hotel bomb explodes, killing SECNAV Clayton Jarvis and seriously injuring Tom Morrow. In the meantime, Vance and Navy Captain Dominick Wayne inform Gibbs that the bombing could involve a terrorist organization a deceased Navy intelligence officer had been investigating. When Gibbs and Tony were shot at by unknown persons and Ducky and Palmer find a former FBI agent-turned-mercenary hacker-for-hire in their autopsy room trying to access their files, Parsons and the NCIS team soon realize that another mysterious person or group is targeting the entire team one by one. Vance also discovers that Ziva is the next target and Tony must track her down before it is too late.

Production

Writing 
"Whiskey Tango Foxtrot" was written by Gary Glasberg and directed by Tony Wharmby. Glasberg had already begun working on the storyline for the episode when it was announced Cote de Pablo, who portrays Ziva David, would not return as a regular for the eleventh season. Because of de Pablo's exit, the continued story from the tenth season finale had to be changed. "Someone asked me if I was planning for this, but I really wasn’t, so basically the minute that this became real, I had to throw out a lot of what I was planning to do and start from scratch". Instead of the planned "single premiere episode" Glasberg extended it to a two-part arc because of the departure of Cote de Pablo's character Ziva David.

Casting 
On July 30, 2013, TV Guide announced the return of Colin Hanks for the first two episodes as Defense Department investigator Richard Parsons, a character that was introduced at the end of the tenth season. Joe Spano and Alan Dale also reprised their roles as Senior FBI Agent Tobias C. Fornell and Tom Morrow. On the same date Margo Harshman was cast in a potentially recurring role as Timothy McGee's girlfriend, Delilah.

Reception 
"Whiskey Tango Foxtrot" was seen by 20.02 million live viewers following its broadcast on September 24, 2013, with a 3.6/11 share among adults aged 18 to 49. A rating point represents one percent of the total number of television sets in American households, and a share means the percentage of television sets in use tuned to the program. In total viewers, "Whiskey Tango Foxtrot" easily won NCIS and CBS the night. Compared to the last episode "Damned If You Do", "Whiskey Tango Foxtrot" was up in viewers and adults 18–49.

Douglas Wolfe from TV Fanatic gave the episode 4.8/5 and stated that "With the announcement of Cote de Pablo's exit from the series, writer Gary Glasberg had to scramble to plot out a decent storyline – and it showed. Intricate and detailed, this episode demanded our full attention. […] Frankly, this is the kind of NCIS show I find compelling: lots of action and lots to think about."

References

2013 American television episodes
NCIS (season 11) episodes